Khalil Amira El-Maghrabi (January 1, 1914 – May 26, 1976) was an Egyptian boxer. He competed in the 1936 Summer Olympics.

Career
In 1936, El-Maghrabi was eliminated in the first round of the featherweight class, after having lost his fight to eventual bronze medalist Josef Miner.

References

1914 births
1976 deaths
Featherweight boxers
Olympic boxers of Egypt
Boxers at the 1936 Summer Olympics
Egyptian male boxers
20th-century Egyptian people